The MPMan music player, manufactured by the South Korean company SaeHan Information Systems, debuted in Asia in March 1998, and was the first mass-produced portable solid state digital audio player.

The internal flash memory could be expanded, but there was no support for external memory. It was delivered with a docking station. To put music into the device, the music first had to be encoded in the mp3 format by an encoder provided by the user, and then transferred via the parallel port to the docking station that connected to the portable player device.

In North America, the South Korean device was first imported for sale by Michael Robertson's  in mid-1998. Around the same time, Eiger Labs, Inc. imported and rebranded the player in two models, the Eiger MPMan F10, and Eiger MPMan F20.

The US price in 1998 for the F10 model with  flash memory was circa .

The  was a similar model that used  SmartMedia cards for expansion, and ran on a single AA battery, instead of rechargeable NiMH batteries.

Technical data MPMan MP F-10

Player device:
 Memory: 16/32/64/128 (MP-F60 T12) MB
 Dimensions: 16.5 mm thick, 70 mm wide, 90 mm tall
 Weight: 65 grams (without battery)
 Signal/Noise ratio: 70 dB
 Distortion rate: 0.1%
 Maximum output: 5 mW
 Output Connector: 3.5 mm stereo TRS connector for headphones
 Frequency response: 20 – 20,000 Hz
 Power Supply: Rechargeable Battery (gum type DC 1.2V 1000mAh x 2)
 Power Supply (MP-F60 T12): (Rechargeable) AA Battery DC 1.5V x 1
 Available colors: Gold, Pink, Silver, Skeleton black, Blue
Docking station:
 Dimensions: 30 mm thick, 133 mm x 110 mm
 Weight: 80 grams
 Power: DC 9V 400mA (AC adapter included)

Technical data MPMan MP-F60 T12

Player device:
 Memory: 16/32/64/128 MB
 Dimensions: 16.5 mm thick, 70 mm wide, 90 mm tall
 Weight: 65 grams (without battery)
 Signal/Noise ratio: 70 dB
 Distortion rate: 0.1%
 Maximum output: 5 mW
 Output Connector: 4 pin 3.5 mm stereo TRS connector for headphones and wired remote.
 Frequency response: 20 – 20,000 Hz
 Power Supply: one DC 1.5V (Rechargeable) AA Battery
 Available colors: Gold, Pink, Silver, Skeleton black, Blue

Audio recording function and AM / FM radio.

Memory expansion by Smart Media Cards.

Critical reception
The RIAA's Associate Director of Anti-Copyright infringement initially said the MPMan had "no function other than playing material that was stolen from record companies". Nevertheless, he later said it was "a unique device. It's something that we haven't seen on the market before".

References

Audiovisual introductions in 1998
Digital audio players
South Korean inventions